This is a list of countries by recoverable shale gas based on data collected by the Energy Information Administration agency of the United States Department of Energy.  Numbers for the estimated amount of recoverable shale gas resources are provided alongside numbers for proven natural gas reserves.

Table 

* indicates "Natural resources in COUNTRY or TERRITORY" links.

See also
Shale gas by country
Hydraulic fracturing by country

References

Energy-related lists by country
 List
Lists of countries